The Sovereign Wealth Fund Institute or SWF Institute, or SWFI, is a global corporation analyzing public asset owners such as sovereign wealth funds and other long-term governmental investors.  Initially, the Sovereign Wealth Fund Institute focused solely on sovereign wealth funds. It has branched out to cover all types of public institutional investors.  The institute sells its subscription and API/datafeed services as a financial data vendor but provides information to the media as well. Incorporated in 2008, it was founded by Michael Maduell and shortly he brought in Carl Linaburg. Carl Linaburg left the organization in 2017. In late 2022, Lakshmi Narayanan of the Patel Family Office was named Chairman of SWFI.

SWFI sells its research and data via subscriptions to asset managers, banks, researchers, universities, governments, institutional investors, asset owners, corporations, law firms and other entities.

In 2020, SWFI started to initiate coverage over family office sector and wealth management firms.

Transparency ratings
The SWFI came out with the Linaburg-Maduell Transparency Index in 2008.  It is a 10-point scale based on ten principles of transparency, each adding one point to the index rating. The index is used by sovereign wealth funds in their annual reports.

Data
The SWFI tracks direct deals in sovereign wealth funds. The value of global direct deals by sovereign-wealth funds hit $50.02 billion in the first half of 2014.

SWFI tracks the assets of sovereign wealth funds, pensions, endowments and other asset owners.  Norway's sovereign wealth fund crossed $1 trillion in assets in 2017.

References 

Financial services companies established in 2007
Foreign direct investment
Economic research institutes
Mass media companies of the United States
Financial data vendors
Business intelligence organizations